Taibaiella soli is a Gram-negative, oval-shaped, non-spore-forming and motile bacterium from the genus of Taibaiella which has been isolated from soil from a pine forest.

References

External links
Type strain of Taibaiella soli at BacDive -  the Bacterial Diversity Metadatabase

Chitinophagia
Bacteria described in 2016